John Andrew Simpson (born 13 July 1988) is an English cricketer who plays for Middlesex County Cricket Club. Simpson is a wicket-keeper and left-handed batsman who won the Denis Compton Award in 2004 at Lancashire, and 2011 at Middlesex. He made his international debut for the England cricket team in July 2021.

Career

Domestic career 
Simpson represented England U19s on tour to India in 2004/05 aged 16 and again in 2005/06 on a tour to Bangladesh. For the 2007 season he joined Lancashire on a scholarship, he played second XI cricket for Lancashire, Durham and Nottinghamshire during the campaign.

In 2009 he made his professional debut when selected for Middlesex's Twenty20 match against Sussex. On 9 April 2010, Simpson made his first-class debut against Worcestershire at New Road. He made 20 in the first and 0 in the second innings as Middlesex were beaten by 111 runs, he did however take 5 catches behind the stumps.

Simpson averaged 18.05 in the 2012 season, with no hundreds or fifties. However, in the opening round of matches of the 2013 County Championship, Simpson made 97 not out for Middlesex.

In 2018, he played for Brothers Union in the 2017–18 Dhaka Premier Division Cricket League in Bangladesh.

He was signed by Northern Superchargers for first edition of The Hundred tournament. In April 2022, he was bought by the Northern Superchargers for the 2022 season of The Hundred.

International career 
In July 2021, Simpson was named in England's One Day International (ODI) squad for their series against Pakistan, after the original squad for the tour was forced to withdraw following positive tests for COVID-19. Simpson made his ODI debut on 8 July 2021, for England against Pakistan.

Family links to other sports

Simpson is the grandson and great-grandson of two former professional rugby league footballers who were regarded as two of the best s in the game at their times.

Simpson's grandfather, Ken Gowers (Walter's son) was the outstanding  for Swinton from the 1950s to the 1970s. Ken was one of several Swinton players who were capped for Great Britain during the 1960s when the Lions' ground Station Road was the scene of many great Lions' victories in the club's postwar "swinging sixties" decade. Ken Gowers was also a useful cricketer. He would often change from the oval ball game to the summer game after rugby league fixtures were completed each spring.

John Simpson's father Jack Simpson played Lacrosse for England and Rochdale for whom he played in two world championships.

References

External links

1988 births
Living people
Brothers Union cricketers
Cricketers from Bury, Greater Manchester
Cumberland cricketers
England One Day International cricketers
English cricketers
Marylebone Cricket Club cricketers
Middlesex cricketers
North v South cricketers
Northern Superchargers cricketers
Wicket-keepers